Sunwoo Yong-nyeo (born Jung Yong-rye on August 15, 1945) is a South Korean actress. Sunwoo originally wanted to become a classical ballerina, but when she passed TBC's open recruitment in 1965, this led to her entertainment debut as a dancer on television. She began acting in 1966, and went on to an acting career in film, TV and stage spanning five decades. In 2010, Sunwoo also became the CEO of matchmaking company Red Hills.

Filmography

Film

Television series

Variety show

Theater

Ambassadorship 
 Public Relations Ambassador 2022 Boryeong Marine Mud Expo (2022)

Awards and nominations

References

External links 
 
 
 
 

1945 births
Living people
South Korean television actresses
South Korean film actresses
South Korean musical theatre actresses
South Korean stage actresses
20th-century South Korean actresses
21st-century South Korean actresses
South Korean television presenters
South Korean broadcasters
South Korean women television presenters
VJs (media personalities)
South Korean Buddhists